KTKB-LD, virtual and UHF digital channel 26, is a low-powered CW+-affiliated television station serving the U.S. territory of Guam that is licensed to Tamuning. Owned by Chicago-based KM Communications, the station is operated by Marianas Media under a local marketing agreement (LMA). It is carried island-wide on cable channel 4 on MCV Broadband and GTA's GUdTV system (hence the CW 4 Guam branding).

Despite being a low-power television station, KTKB's signal covers all of Guam. It is also the territory's first fully digital commercial television station.

History
The station went on the air on April 20, 2009, though it received its construction permit on September 3, 2003. Like most of the television stations in Guam, KTKB followed a Tuesday through Monday schedule for its CW primetime lineup because of Guam being a day ahead of the United States. However, it was the first station in Guam to air first-run syndicated fare and classic shows, most of them from the Sony Pictures Television library, though programming from Universal Media Studios and Warner Bros. Television was added in September 2009. By April 2010, other stations in Guam, notably KTGM and KEQI-LP, began adding syndicated product.

KTKB was one of the few stations to still sign off overnight, doing so at 1 a.m. It did not actually go off-the-air; rather, it simply showed station promos and public service announcements.

In March 2010, KTKB launched a half-hour newscast, Guam News Watch, which competed with KUAM News and Pacific News Center at 6 p.m. and 10 p.m. The newscast was canceled on January 4, 2011. On March 31, the station ceased operations, however, KTKB returned to the air on January 9, 2012.

Digital television

See also
Channel 4 branded TV stations in the United States
Channel 26 digital TV stations in the United States
Channel 26 low-power TV stations in the United States
Channel 26 virtual TV stations in the United States

References

External links

TKB-LD
The CW affiliates
Television channels and stations established in 2009
Low-power television stations in the United States
2009 establishments in Guam